Igor Lebedev may refer to:

 Igor Lebedev (footballer) (born 1978), Russian footballer
 Igor Lebedev (diplomat), Russian diplomat
 Igor Lebedev (politician) (b. 1972), Russian politician